Francis Holland School is the name of two separate private day schools for girls in central London, England, governed by the Francis Holland (Church of England) Schools Trust. The schools are located at Clarence Gate (near Regent's Park NW1) and at Graham Terrace (near Sloane Square SW1).

History 
The schools were founded in the 1870s by Canon Francis James Holland for the education of girls in London. He was born in London on 20 January 1828 and educated at Eton College and Trinity College, Cambridge. The Regent's Park School is the older of the two schools but no longer has a Junior Department. Both schools have developed their facilities over the last few years.

The Sloane Square School was opened with 13 pupils on 1 March 1881 at 80 Coleshill Street, Belgravia, later renamed as 28 Eaton Terrace. Within a year, the school expanded into a further property opposite but as this arrangement proved awkward, Canon Holland purchased a site on the corner of Graham Street, now Graham Terrace where a new school building was constructed ready for occupation in October 1884. Francis Holland, Regent's Park, used to accept boys as primary school pupils but they would leave as soon as the girls moved on to secondary education.

Francis Holland, Regent's Park 

There are about 500 pupils at the school, and about 120 sixth-formers. Most of their sports take place in Regent's Park and Paddington Recreational Grounds.

Francis Holland, Sloane Square

There are over 600 pupils on roll, 164 of whom are in the Junior School aged between 4 and 11 years, and 100 sixth-formers. Most of the School's sports take place in Battersea Park. Francis Holland, Sloane Square, is also ranked highly in league tables and is noted by The Good Schools Guide as having an "outstandingly high quality" in its Arts, History and MFL (modern foreign languages) departments.

Notable alumnae

Amber Agar, actress
Camilla Arfwedson, actress
Lady Sarah Armstrong-Jones, member of the Royal family
Amanda Donohoe, actress
Justice Ayesha A. Malik, Judge Lahore High Court
Eleanor Burbidge, astronomer
Jackie Collins OBE, novelist
Dame Joan Collins, actress and writer
Lady Mary Charteris, singer and model
Cara Delevingne, model
Petra Ecclestone, fashion designer
Tamara Ecclestone, TV presenter
Emilia Fox, actress
Louisa Garrett Anderson, medical pioneer
Ione Gedye, archaeological conservator and founder of the repair dept at the Institute of Archaeology
Joyce Grenfell, comedian and singer-songwriter
Helen Grimshaw, engineer
Hermione Hammond, artist
Evelyn Jamison, historian and vice principal of Lady Margaret Hall 1921 to 1937
Elizabeth Jane Howard, novelist
Gemma Jones, actress
Jemima Khan (Jemima Goldsmith), journalist
Eleni Kyriacou, fashion designer
Susan Lawrence, Labour politician
Sue Lloyd-Roberts, Special Correspondent for the BBC (formerly at ITN)
Ayesha A. Malik, Incoming Justice of Supreme Court of Pakistan
Sienna Miller, actress
Nancy Mitford, novelist and biographer
Vanessa-Mae, violinist
Farah Nabulsi, filmmaker
Elizabeth Pakenham, Countess of Longford, biographer
Tilly Ramsay, Gordon Ramsay's daughter
Patricia Roc, actress
Christina Scott, former Governor of Anguilla
Rose Tremain, novelist
Theresa Villiers, politician (formerly Secretary of State for Northern Ireland)
Jennifer von Mayrhauser, costume designer
Veronica Wadley, former editor of the Evening Standard
Daisy Waterstone, actress

References

External links 
 FHS, Regent's Park website
 FHS, Sloane Square website
 FHS, Regent's Park alumni website
 FHS, Sloane Square alumni website
 Independent Schools Council profiles – Regent's Park & Sloane Square
 Trust website
 The Francis Holland (Church of England) Schools Trust – Charity Commission

Educational institutions established in 1878
Private girls' schools in London
Member schools of the Girls' Schools Association
Knightsbridge
Private schools in the City of Westminster
Regent's Park
Church of England private schools in the Diocese of London
1878 establishments in England